The Castle of Thy-le-Chateau is a medieval castle located in Thy-le-Château, Walcourt in the Province of Namur in Belgium. Originally built in the 12th century, it served as the military fortress for several noble clans until the French Revolution, when it fell into disrepair. The castle was successfully restored in 1939.

See also
List of castles in Belgium

External links
Contact data to visit castle of Thy-le-chateau,  Belgium Tourist Office  website Wallonia and Brussels
Description and photos of castle of Thy-le-chateau, www.castles.nl

References

Thy-le-Chateau